Pandermochelys is a clade of sea turtles belonging to the superfamily Chelonioidea. It is defined as all turtles more closely related to leatherback sea turtles than to cheloniids (green sea turtles and relatives). It includes the largest living turtles, the leatherback sea turtle, as well as the largest sea turtles of all time, Archelon.

References

 
Cretaceous turtles
Extant Cretaceous first appearances